The Tasmanian Government Railways DP class was a class of diesel railcars operated by the Tasmanian Government Railways.

History

The DP class diesel railcars comprised eight different batches of vehicles. The early members were originally petrol powered wooden bodied rail motors while the latter units were articulated units. These latter units were initially used on the Tasman Limited when it was introduced in April 1954 until locomotive hauled stock was built. Some lasted in service until the cessation of passenger services in 1978. One was retained until 1996 as a track inspection vehicle.

Eight have been preserved:
DP13 at the DownsSteam Tourist Railway & Museum, Queensland
DP14 at Karoola railway station
DP15 at the Tasmanian Transport Museum
DP22 at the Don River Railway
DP24 as part of the Margate Train
DP26 at the Tasmanian Transport Museum
DP28 at the Bellarine Railway, Victoria
DP29 at the Bellarine Railway, Victoria

References

Articulated passenger trains
Railcars of Australia